12th Reserve Division (12. Reserve-Division) was a unit of the Imperial German Army in World War I.  The division was formed on mobilization of the German Army in August 1914 as part of VI Reserve Corps.  The division was disbanded in 1919 during the demobilization of the German Army after World War I.  The division was recruited in the Province of Silesia, mainly Upper Silesia.

Combat chronicle

The 12th Reserve Division fought on the Western Front, participating in the opening German offensive which led to the Allied Great Retreat.  Thereafter, the division remained in the line in the Verdun region until February 1916, when it entered the Battle of Verdun.  The division later fought in the Battle of the Somme.  It remained in the Flanders-Artois region for the rest of the war, and fought in the Battle of Passchendaele in 1917.  Allied intelligence rated the division as second class.

Order of battle on mobilization

The order of battle of the 12th Reserve Division on mobilization was as follows:

22. Reserve-Infanterie-Brigade
Reserve-Infanterie-Regiment von Winterfeldt (2. Oberschlesisches) Nr.23
Reserve-Infanterie-Regiment Nr. 38
Reserve-Jäger-Bataillon Nr. 6
23. Reserve-Infanterie-Brigade
Reserve-Infanterie-Regiment Nr. 22
Reserve-Infanterie-Regiment Nr. 51
Reserve-Ulanen-Regiment Nr. 4
Reserve-Feldartillerie-Regiment Nr. 12
1.Reserve-Kompanie/Pionier-Bataillon Nr. 6
2.Reserve-Kompanie/Pionier-Bataillon Nr. 6

Order of battle on February 20, 1918

The 12th Reserve Division was triangularized in April 1915. Over the course of the war, other changes took place, including the formation of artillery and signals commands and a pioneer battalion.  The order of battle on February 20, 1918, was as follows:

22. Reserve-Infanterie-Brigade
Reserve-Infanterie-Regiment Nr. 23
Reserve-Infanterie-Regiment Nr. 38
Reserve-Infanterie-Regiment Nr. 51
2.Eskadron/Reserve-Husaren-Regiment Nr. 4
Artillerie-Kommandeur 99
Reserve-Feldartillerie-Regiment Nr. 12
Pionier-Bataillon Nr. 312
Divisions-Nachrichten-Kommandeur 412

References
 12. Reserve-Division (Chronik 1914/1918) - Der erste Weltkrieg
 Hermann Cron et al., Ruhmeshalle unserer alten Armee (Berlin, 1935)
 Hermann Cron, Geschichte des deutschen Heeres im Weltkriege 1914-1918 (Berlin, 1937)
 Günter Wegner, Stellenbesetzung der deutschen Heere 1815-1939. (Biblio Verlag, Osnabrück, 1993), Bd. 1
 Histories of Two Hundred and Fifty-One Divisions of the German Army which Participated in the War (1914-1918), compiled from records of Intelligence section of the General Staff, American Expeditionary Forces, at General Headquarters, Chaumont, France 1919 (1920)

Notes

Infantry divisions of Germany in World War I
Military units and formations established in 1914
Military units and formations disestablished in 1919
1914 establishments in Germany